Neil Cameron (2 September 1929 – September 1978) was a Scotland international rugby union footballer, who played as a fullback.

Rugby union career

Amateur career

Cameron played for Glasgow University.

Provincial career

Cameron played for Glasgow District against Edinburgh District in the 1952–53 Inter-City match. Glasgow won the match 14 – 13, Cameron kicking penalties and a conversion to secure Glasgow's win.

International career

He was capped for  three times in 1952, all of the caps coming in the Five Nations matches.

Cameron battled for the Scotland fullback place with Ian Thomson. Thomson usually won the battle and he secured 7 caps to Cameron's 3 caps.

References

1929 births
1978 deaths
Rugby union players from Carlisle, Cumbria
Scottish rugby union players
Scotland international rugby union players
Glasgow University RFC players
Glasgow District (rugby union) players
Rugby union fullbacks